Eugenie Pappenheim (born between 1842 and 1849 – 1924) was an Austrian-American operatic soprano.

Life 
Born in Vienna, Pappenheim made her debut in Linz in 1866 as Valentine in Les Huguenots. Further engagements at German and Austrian opera houses followed; notably guest performances in Hamburg in 1874.

In 1875, Pappenheim emigrated to America as a member of Theodor Wachtel's Wachtel Opera Company. In 1876, she appeared as Senta in the American premiere of The Flying Dutchman in Philadelphia. In 1877, she founded her own opera company with other musicians, with whom she undertook a tour of the US. The Adams-Pappenheim Opera Company was named after her and the tenor Charles R. Adams. She also appeared once more in Europe in guest performances, including Berlin. After her stage career ended, she worked as a singing teacher in New York and Los Angeles where she died in 1924. One of her students was coloratura soprano Frida Benneche.

In the US, she married Rudolf Ballin (1860-1922), a businessman from Hamburg who had immigrated there in 1880. In her will, Ballin bequeathed 10,000 US dollars each to the cities of Hamburg and Vienna, with which she felt particularly connected; under the condition that the money should benefit poor Hamburg children. Accordingly, the city of Hamburg established the Rudolf Ballin Foundation in 1925, which eighty years later in 2005 was operating twelve day-care centres for children.

References 

Austrian operatic sopranos
Austro-Hungarian musicians
Austrian Empire emigrants to the United States
Date of birth missing
1924 deaths
Musicians from Vienna